Sebastian Ströbel (born 2 February 1977) is a German film and TV actor. He is best known for his performance as Jan Brenner in the TV Series Countdown – Die Jagd beginnt  (Countdown – The hunt begins).

Selected filmography

References

External links
 
 Agency profile

1977 births
Living people
German male film actors
German male television actors
Actors from Karlsruhe